Nordmark is a locality situated in Filipstad Municipality, Värmland County, Sweden with 225 inhabitants in 2010.

References 

Populated places in Värmland County
Populated places in Filipstad Municipality